Streptomyces phage Φ0 is a bacteriophage that infects Streptomyces. It was discovered in 2016. The bacteriophage contains a double-stranded RNA genome and probably belongs to the Cystoviridae family.

References 

Cystoviridae
Bacteriophages
Unaccepted virus taxa
Infraspecific virus taxa